The Oyster Bay Wind Power Station is an operational  wind power plant in South Africa. The power station was developed and is owned by Enel Green Power, a subsidiary of the Italian energy conglomerate, Enel, headquartered in Rome. The energy generated at this wind farm is sold to the South African national electricity utility company Eskom, under a 20-year power purchase agreement (PPA).

Location
The power station is located in Oyster Bay, in Kouga Municipality, Sarah Baartman District, in the Eastern Cape Province of South Africa.

The geographical coordinates of the power station are 34°06'40.0"S, 24°37'47.0"E (Latitude:-34.111111; Longitude:24.629722).

Overview
The power station has a maximum generation capacity of 140 megawatts. The power station was built, funded and is operated by the South African unit of Enel Green Power, referred to as Enel Green Power RSA (EGP-RSA). This power station is one of nine wind and solar installations in South Arica, that Enel Green Power RSA has in operation in the country, as part of the South African government's Renewable Energy Independent Power Producer Procurement Program (REIPPP). Together, the nine renewable energy installations installed and managed by (EGP-RSA), add in excess of 800 megawatts of the South Arica national grid, as of July 2021.

Construction costs
Enel, Enel Green Power and EGP-RSA spent approximately €180 million (US$212 million) to develop and build this power station.

Other considerations
It is expected that the wind farm will add 568GWh to the South African national grid every year. This will aid the country in avoiding the emission of 590,000 tons of carbon dioxide annually.

See also

 List of power stations in South Africa
 Wesley–Ciskei Wind Power Station
 Kangnas Wind Power Station

References

External links
 Construction of 140MW Oyster Bay wind farm in South Africa begins As of 30 May 2019.

Economy of the Eastern Cape
Wind farms in South Africa
Energy infrastructure in Africa
2021 establishments in South Africa
Energy infrastructure completed in 2021
21st-century architecture in South Africa